Akbarh Omar Arreola Jiménez (born January 14, 1983) is a Mexican mixed martial artist who competed in the Lightweight division of the Ultimate Fighting Championship. He also had competed in the Welterweight division.

Mixed martial arts career

The Ultimate Fighter
In February 2012, it was revealed that Arreola would be a participant on The Ultimate Fighter 15. He was defeated in the entry round by Myles Jury via unanimous decision.

Ultimate Fighting Championship
Arreola made his promotional debut against Tiago Trator on July 26, 2014 at UFC on Fox 12. He lost the fight via unanimous decision.

In his second UFC fight, Arreola faced Yves Edwards on November 22, 2014 at UFC Fight Night 57. He won the fight via submission in the first round.

Arreola faced Francisco Trinaldo on March 21, 2015 at UFC Fight Night 62. He lost the fight via unanimous decision.

Arreola is faced Jake Matthews on November 15, 2015 at UFC 193. He lost the fight via TKO (doctor stoppage) after the second round and was subsequently released from the promotion following the loss.

On April 26, 2016, Arreola announced his retirement from mixed martial arts.

Championships and accomplishments

Mixed martial arts
 Maximum Cage Fighting
 MMAX Fights Welterweight Championship (One time)
 Ultimate Warrior Challenge
 UWC Mexico Welterweight Championship (One time)

Mixed martial arts record

|-
|Win
|align=center|26–11–1
|Walter Luna
|Submission (armbar)
|UWC 35
|
|align=center|1
|align=center|2:16
|Tijuana, Mexico
|
|-
|Win
|align=center|25–11–1
|Gammaliel Escarrega
|Submission (heel hook)
|UWC: Legacy
|
|align=center|1
|align=center|3:41
|Tijuana, Mexico
|
|-
|Loss
|align=center|24–11–1
|Kazuki Tokudome
|TKO (punches)
|Pancrase: 277
|
|align=center|1
|align=center|4:59
|Tokyo, Japan
|
|-
|Loss
|align=center|24–10–1
|Jake Matthews
|TKO (doctor stoppage)
|UFC 193
|
|align=center|2
|align=center|5:00
|Melbourne, Australia
|
|-
| Loss
| align=center| 24–9–1
| Francisco Trinaldo
| Decision (unanimous)
| UFC Fight Night: Maia vs. LaFlare
| 
| align=center| 3
| align=center| 5:00
| Rio de Janeiro, Brazil
| 
|-
| Win
| align=center| 24–8–1
| Yves Edwards
| Submission (armbar)
| UFC Fight Night: Edgar vs. Swanson
| 
| align=center| 1
| align=center| 1:52
| Austin, Texas, United States
| 
|-
| Loss
| align=center| 23–8–1
| Tiago Trator
| Decision (unanimous)
| UFC on Fox: Lawler vs. Brown
| 
| align=center| 3
| align=center| 5:00
| San Jose, California, United States
| 
|-
| Win
| align=center| 23–7–1
| Alejandro Solano Rodriguez
| Submission (rear-naked choke)
| CRMMA: Costa Rica MMA 1
| 
| align=center| 2
| align=center| 1:42
| Heredia, Costa Rica
| 
|-
| Win
| align=center| 22–7–1
| Jason Meaders
| Submission (armbar)
| SCMMA 3: Fight to the End
| 
| align=center| 1
| align=center| 1:06
| Ontario, California, United States
| 
|-
| Win
| align=center| 21–7–1
| Juan Voelker
| Submission (armbar)
| UWC Mexico 13: Benitez vs. Oropeza
| 
| align=center| 1
| align=center| 3:04
| Tijuana, Mexico
| 
|-
| Loss
| align=center| 20–7–1
| Juan Manuel Puig
| TKO (punches)
| XK 17: Xtreme Kombat 17
| 
| align=center| 1
| align=center| 4:46
| Mexico City, Mexico
| 
|-
| Loss
| align=center| 20–6–1
| Ronys Torres
| Decision (unanimous)
| Shooto Brazil 25: Fight for BOPE
| 
| align=center| 3
| align=center| 5:00
| Rio de Janeiro, Brazil
| 
|-
| Win
| align=center| 20–5–1
| Gilberto Aguilar
| Submission (triangle Choke)
| UWC Mexico 10: To The Edge
| 
| align=center| 1
| align=center| 1:25
| Tijuana, Mexico
| 
|-
| Win
| align=center| 19–5–1
| Carlos Torres
| KO (punch)
| UWC Mexico 9: They're Back
| 
| align=center| 1
| align=center| 2:34
| Tijuana, Mexico
| 
|-
| Win
| align=center| 18–5–1
| Jorge Lopez
| TKO (punches)
| UWC Mexico 8: Mexican Championships
| 
| align=center| 2
| align=center| 4:47
| Tijuana, Mexico
| 
|-
| Win
| align=center| 17–5–1
| Matt Lagler
| Submission (armbar)
| UWC Mexico 6: Made in Mexico
| 
| align=center| 2
| align=center| 4:07
| Tijuana, Mexico
| 
|-
| Loss
| align=center| 16–5–1
| Brent Weedman
| TKO (punches)
| MMAX 23: MMA Xtreme 23
| 
| align=center| 2
| align=center| 0:42
| Cancun, Mexico
| 
|-
| Win
| align=center| 16–4–1
| Adam Lehman
| Submission (triangle Choke)
| UWC Mexico 2: Cachanilla Fury
| 
| align=center| 1
| align=center| 0:49
| Tijuana, Mexico
| 
|-
| Win
| align=center| 15–4–1
| Luciano Correa
| TKO (corner stoppage)
| MMAX 21: MMA Xtreme 21
| 
| align=center| 2
| align=center| 5:00
| Mexico City, Mexico
| 
|-
| Win
| align=center| 14–4–1
| David Gardner
| Decision (split)
| MMAX 18: Going Home
| 
| align=center| 3
| align=center| 5:00
| Tijuana, Mexico
| 
|-
| Win
| align=center| 13–4–1
| Gabe Ruediger
| Submission (kimura)
| MMAX 15: MMA Xtreme 15
| 
| align=center| 1
| align=center| 2:03
| Mexico City, Mexico
| 
|-
| Win
| align=center| 12–4–1
| Mike Tseng
| Submission (triangle Choke)
| MMAX 12: MMA Xtreme 12
| 
| align=center| 1
| align=center| 1:43
| Mexicali, Mexico
| 
|-
| Win
| align=center| 11–4–1
| Marquis McKnight
| TKO
| MMAX 9: MMA Xtreme 9
| 
| align=center| 1
| align=center| 0:00
| Tijuana, Mexico
| 
|-
| Win
| align=center| 10–4–1
| Lucas Factor
| Submission (armbar)
| MMAX 7: MMA Xtreme 7
| 
| align=center| 1
| align=center| N/A
| Tijuana, Mexico
| 
|-
| Win
| align=center| 9–4–1
| Jose Luis Cocafuego
| Submission (triangle Choke)
| MMAX 6: MMA Xtreme 6
| 
| align=center| 1
| align=center| 0:00
| Mexico
| 
|-
| Win
| align=center| 8–4–1
| Hajime Ohara
| Submission (armbar)
| MMAX 4: MMA Xtreme 4
| 
| align=center| 1
| align=center| N/A
| Tijuana, Mexico
| 
|-
| Win
| align=center| 7–4–1
| Kasuchina Okada
| Submission (choke)
| MMAX 3: MMA Xtreme 3
| 
| align=center| 1
| align=center| 0:00
| Mexico
| 
|-
| Win
| align=center| 6–4–1
| Jude Gonzales
| Submission (triangle Choke)
| MMAX 1: MMA Xtreme 1
| 
| align=center| 1
| align=center| N/A
| Tijuana, Mexico
| 
|-
| Loss
| align=center| 5–4–1
| Toby Imada
| Decision (unanimous)
| TC 12: Total Combat 12
| 
| align=center| 3
| align=center| 5:00
| Tijuana, Mexico
| 
|-
| Loss
| align=center| 5–3–1
| Toby Imada
| TKO (corner stoppage)
| TC 9: Total Combat 9
| 
| align=center| 2
| align=center| 5:00
| Tijuana, Mexico
| 
|-
| Draw
| align=center| 5–2–1
| Antonio McKee
| Draw
| CFC 1: Crown Fighting 1
| 
| align=center| 2
| align=center| 5:00
| Rosarito Beach, Mexico
| 
|-
| Loss
| align=center| 5–2
| Mac Danzig
| TKO (punches)
| RM 5: Road to the Championship
| 
| align=center| 1
| align=center| 1:22
| Tijuana, Mexico
| 
|-
| Win
| align=center| 5–1
| Steve Barnett
| Submission (triangle Choke)
| TC 3: Total Combat 3
| 
| align=center| 1
| align=center| 0:50
| Tijuana, Mexico
| 
|-
| Win
| align=center| 4–1
| Alex Ramirez
| Submission (triangle Choke)
| RM 4: Beat Down in Baja
| 
| align=center| 2
| align=center| 3:22
| Tijuana, Mexico
| 
|-
| Win
| align=center| 3–1
| Angel Santibanez
| Submission (kimura)
| Extreme International Evolution
| 
| align=center| 1
| align=center| 1:02
| Ensenada, Mexico
| 
|-
| Win
| align=center| 2–1
| Hector Carrillo
| Submission (triangle choke)
| RM 3: Reto Maximo 3
| 
| align=center| 1
| align=center| 1:07
| Tijuana, Mexico
| 
|-
| Win
| align=center| 1–1
| Fernando Zatarain
| KO
| RM 2: Reto Maximo 2
| 
| align=center| 1
| align=center| 0:14
| Tijuana, Mexico
| 
|-
| Loss
| align=center| 0–1
| Ricardo Corrales
| TKO (corner toppage)
| RM 1: Reto Maximo 1
| 
| align=center| 1
| align=center| 5:00
| Tijuana, Mexico
|

See also
List of male mixed martial artists

References

External links
 
  

1983 births
Mexican male mixed martial artists
Lightweight mixed martial artists
Welterweight mixed martial artists
Mixed martial artists utilizing American Kenpo
Mixed martial artists utilizing Brazilian jiu-jitsu
Sportspeople from Tijuana
Living people
Mexican practitioners of Brazilian jiu-jitsu
People awarded a black belt in Brazilian jiu-jitsu
Mexican male karateka
Ultimate Fighting Championship male fighters